Titular may refer to:

Arts, entertainment, and media
 Title character in a narrative work, the character referred to in its title

Religion
 Titular (Catholicism), a cardinal who holds a titulus, one of the main churches of Rome
 Titular bishop, a bishop who is not in charge of a diocese
 Titular church, a church in Rome assigned or assignable to one of the cardinals
 Titular see, an episcopal see of a former diocese that no longer functions

Other uses
 Titular nation, the single dominant ethnic group in the state, typically after which the state was named
 Titular ruler, a person in an official position of leadership who possesses few, if any, actual powers
 Pretender

See also

Nominal (disambiguation)
Titulus (disambiguation)